Zinc finger and SCAN domain containing 18 is a protein that in humans is encoded by the ZSCAN18 gene.

References

Further reading